Hatchie National Wildlife Refuge is an area of swampy bottomland consisting of a portion of the floodplain of the Hatchie River in West Tennessee, covering 11,556 acres (4,677 ha) in southern Haywood County.  It is a rich environment for aquatic life and waterfowl.  The refuge is bisected by Interstate 40 and hence passed through by almost all motor vehicle traffic between Nashville and Memphis. Wildlife includes Fish, Snakes, and Mammals.

References
Refuge website

External links

Protected areas of Haywood County, Tennessee
National Wildlife Refuges in Tennessee
Floodplains of the United States
Wetlands of Tennessee
Landforms of Haywood County, Tennessee
Landforms of Hardeman County, Tennessee
1964 establishments in Tennessee
Protected areas established in 1964